The 2013 World Cyber Games (also known as WCG 2013) took place from 28 November to 1 December 2013 in Kunshan, Jiangsu, China. It was the third time the World Cyber Games was held in China. The event hosted 500 players from 40 countries

Official games

PC games
 Crossfire (SmileGate)
 FIFA 14 (Electronic Arts)
 League of Legends (Riot Games)
 StarCraft II: Wings of Liberty (Blizzard)
 Super Street Fighter IV: Arcade Edition Ver. 2012 (Capcom)
 Warcraft III: The Frozen Throne (Blizzard)
 World of Tanks (Wargaming)

Promotion games
 Assault Fire (Tencent)
 QQ Speed (Tencent Holdings)

Results

Official

Promotion

References

2013 in Chinese sport
2013 in esports
League of Legends competitions
StarCraft competitions
Warcraft competitions
World Cyber Games events
Esports competitions in China
Kunshan
Sport in Suzhou